The amalgamation of Toronto was the creation of the city limits of Toronto, Ontario, Canada after amalgamating, annexing, and merging with surrounding municipalities since the 18th century. The most recent occurrence of amalgamation was in 1998, which dissolved the federation of Metropolitan Toronto and its constituent municipalities, and created the current "megacity" of Toronto.

1791–1882: Founding of settlements

1791: The townships of Etobicoke, York and Scarborough are surveyed in preparation for settlement.
1793: The unincorporated town of York is founded within York township on August 27.  This is named in honour of the Duke of York and Albany, King George III's second son.  The area had previously been known as Toronto.
1830: The unincorporated Village of Yorkville was founded.
1834: York was incorporated under the city name of Toronto, coming into force on March 6.  It was the largest town in Upper Canada with a population of 9,250  The city had five wards, bounded by Bathurst Street in the west, Parliament Street in the east, the lake to the south and a line analogous to Dundas Street to the north.  Beyond this was an area known as the "Liberties".
1853: The village of Yorkville was incorporated.
1859: The Liberties of Toronto are abolished.
1876: The village of Brockton was incorporated.
1878: The village of Parkdale was incorporated on June 28, to go into effect January 1, 1879.  Parkdale covered , extending from Dufferin Street in the east to Roncesvalles Avenue in the west, from Lake Ontario in the south to the Grand Trunk Railway property and a line between Fermanagh and Wright avenues.
1881: The village of Weston was incorporated.  The village of Brockton became the town of Brockton.

1883–1914: Growth, amalgamation and annexation
The city retained the same boundaries until 1883, when it began to amalgamate with the small surrounding communities.  This continued until 1914, after which no more expansion of Toronto would take place until 1967.
1883: The village of Yorkville was annexed by the city of Toronto.
1884: The town of Brockton and the unincorporated community of Riverdale were annexed by the city of Toronto.
1886: The village of Parkdale becomes the town of Parkdale.
1887: The village of West Toronto Junction was incorporated on land severed from York township.  The population of West Toronto Junction was 579.
1888: The unincorporated community of Seaton Village in York township was annexed by Toronto.  The unincorporated community of Sunnyside was annexed by Toronto.  Sunnyside was located in York township, and covered .  On October 27, the residents of Parkdale vote in favour of being annexed by Toronto.
1889: The town of Parkdale was annexed by the city of Toronto on March 23.  Parkdale had grown to 5651 residents by the time of annexation.  The town of East Toronto was incorporated on land previously belonging to York Township.  West Toronto Junction became a town on March 23, annexing the communities of Carlton and Davenport.
1890: The town of North Toronto was incorporated on land previously belonging to York township.
1891: The town of West Toronto Junction was renamed the town of West Toronto.
1908: On April 14, the town of West Toronto became the city of West Toronto.
1909: The city of West Toronto was annexed by Toronto on May 1.  West Toronto covered  and had 12 000 residents.  The unincorporated communities of Wychwood and Bracondale were annexed by Toronto in February.   Covering , they formerly stood on the land of York township.  The town of East Toronto was annexed by Toronto. The Midway and Balmy Beach, unincorporated communities in York township, were annexed by Toronto on December 15, 1909.
1910: The communities of Earlscourt and Dovercourt were annexed by the city of Toronto in January.  They formerly stood on land belonging to York township.
1911: Mimico was incorporated, severing the land from the township of Etobicoke.
1912: The community of Moore Park was annexed by the city of Toronto.  Moore Park had previously been within York township. North Toronto was annexed by the City of Toronto as well.
1913: The village of Leaside was incorporated on land from York township on April 23.  The town remained sparsely populated despite a well-developed plan for growth; its population would not exceed 500 until 1929.  New Toronto was incorporated on land from the township of Etobicoke.
1914: Mount Pleasant Cemetery is annexed by the city of Toronto, out of York township.

1915–1953: Growth and sprawl
1922: The township of North York was severed from the township of York.
1923: Forest Hill was incorporated on November 23, on land formerly in York township, which went into effect on January 1, 1924.  The exclave township of East York is severed from the township of York.
1925: Swansea was incorporated as a village from land formerly in York township.
1931: Long Branch was severed from Etobicoke township to become a village.
1953: Metropolitan Toronto was created as a new level of government.

1954 federation into Metropolitan Toronto
In 1954, the City of Toronto was federated into a regional government known as Metropolitan Toronto. Metro Toronto was composed of the City of Toronto, the towns of New Toronto, Mimico, Weston, and Leaside; the villages of Long Branch, Swansea, and Forest Hill;
and the townships of Etobicoke, York, North York, East York, and Scarborough.

The postwar boom had resulted in rapid suburban development, and it was believed that a coordinated land use strategy and shared services would provide greater efficiency for the region. The metropolitan government began to manage services that crossed municipal boundaries, including highways, water and public transit.

In Canada, the creation of municipalities falls under provincial jurisdiction. Thus it was provincial legislation, the Metropolitan Toronto Act, that created this level of government in 1953. When it took effect in 1954, the portion of York County south of Steeles Avenue, a concession road and common township boundary, was severed from the county and incorporated as the Municipality of Metropolitan Toronto. The area north of Steeles Avenue remained in York County, which ultimately became York Region in 1971.

The Metropolitan Toronto Council initially consisted of 12 councillors from Toronto (including the mayor), and one representative (usually a mayor or reeve) from each of the surrounding municipalities.

1967 merger
A round of merging was conducted among the municipalities of Metropolitan Toronto in 1967.  The seven smallest municipalities of the region were merged into their larger neighbours, resulting in a six-municipality configuration that included the old City of Toronto and the surrounding municipalities of East York, Etobicoke, North York, Scarborough and York.

Forest Hill and Swansea were annexed by the City of Toronto, Leaside was merged with the township of East York to become the Borough of East York.  Weston was combined with the Township of York to form the Borough of York.  The Village of Long Branch and the towns of Mimico and New Toronto were dissolved, merged with the township of Etobicoke to form the Borough of Etobicoke.  North York township was promoted to the Borough of North York.  Scarborough was also transformed into a borough.

1974: Annexation of lands from Pickering into Scarborough

Concurrent with the creation of Durham Region, the West Rouge area of Pickering south of Twyn Rivers Drive (the original course of Sheppard Avenue) and east of Port Union Road was annexed into Scarborough. In other words, all of Pickering west of the Rouge River was annexed into Scarborough.

1979–1997: Boroughs promoted
1979: North York became a city.
1983: The boroughs of York, Etobicoke and Scarborough became cities.

1998 amalgamation
On January 1, 1998,  the federation of Metropolitan Toronto and its six lower-tier constituent municipalities was dissolved by an act of the Government of Ontario, and formed into a single-tier City of Toronto (colloquially dubbed the "megacity"). The unified city became the fifth-most populous city proper in North America, behind Mexico City, New York City, Los Angeles and Chicago. In 2013, it surpassed Chicago in population.

The amalgamation was widely opposed in Toronto and the other municipalities. The amalgamation occurred despite a municipal referendum in 1997 in which over three-quarters of voters rejected amalgamation, with one third of eligible voters participating. Mayor Mel Lastman of North York, and Barbara Hall of Toronto both campaigned against the merger, as did former mayor John Sewell. Subsequently, Lastman defeated Hall in the 1997 Toronto municipal election to become the first elected mayor of the megacity. However, Canadian municipal governments are legal creations of the provincial governments and local referendums have little to no legal effect. The Harris government thus had the power to ignore the results of the referendum and went ahead with the amalgamation. Opposition parties in the provincial parliament engaged in a unique form of filibuster, tabling thirteen thousand amendments to the amalgamation bill, which lasted two weeks, but did not prevent passage of the bill. Each amendment named an individual street in the city, whose residents the government would be obliged to personally consult for input on the amalgamation proposal; one such amendment, granting consultation rights to residents of Cafon Court in Etobicoke, was successfully passed as not enough members of the Progressive Conservative caucus were present in the chamber to defeat it, but the government later tabled and passed another amendment to rescind the Cafon Court amendment.

The merger was proposed as a cost-saving measure and an administration improvement by the Progressive Conservative provincial government under Mike Harris. In 2007, Barry Hertz reported in the National Post that cost savings never materialized. He also noted that government staff had grown, with the city employing 4,015 more people in 2007 than it did in 1998  Before amalgamation, 73 percent of the expenses taken over by Toronto came from Metro Toronto, and were thus already integrated programs. Additionally, Ontario municipal affairs minister Al Leach touted it as a measure that would produce a stronger, more unified Toronto better equipped to compete in a global marketplace.

Since amalgamation, many organizations and individuals have defied the amalgamation in 
their own way and continue to use the names of the old municipalities instead of using "Toronto". Canada Post mail standards don't forbid the use of former municipalities' names, relying on postal codes for accurate delivery. Although all municipalities were amalgamated, several old street names were retained, resulting in duplicate street names that are disambiguated only by referring to the former municipalities or by the postal code of a particular address.

See also

Greater Toronto Area
Common Sense Revolution, Bill 103

References

History of Toronto
Toronto